The 1929 Lippe state election was held on 6 January 1929 to elect the 21 members of the Landtag of the Free State of Lippe.

Results

References 

Lippe
Elections in North Rhine-Westphalia